Aloísio José da Silva (born 27 January 1975), known as Aloísio Chulapa or just Aloísio, is a Brazilian former footballer who played as a striker.

Aloísio Chulapa suffered a freak accident where he temporarily lost consciousness following a collision during Campeonato Brasileiro Série B match on 25 August 2009.

Career statistics

Club

Honours

Club
Goiás
 Goiás State Championship: 3
 1997, 1998, 1999

Paris Saint-Germain
 UEFA Intertoto Cup: 1
 2001

Atlético Paranaense
 Paraná State Championship: 1
 2005

São Paulo
 FIFA Club World Cup: 1
 2005
 Brazilian Championship: 3
 2006, 2007, 2008

Vasco da Gama
 Brazilian League - Serie B: 1
 2009

Individual
 Libertadores Cup Top Scorer: 1
 2006

References

External links
globoesporte.globo.com 

1975 births
Living people
Brazilian footballers
Brazilian expatriate footballers
Association football forwards
Expatriate footballers in France
Expatriate footballers in Russia
Expatriate footballers in Qatar
Campeonato Brasileiro Série A players
Campeonato Brasileiro Série B players
Campeonato Brasileiro Série D players
Ligue 1 players
Russian Premier League players
CR Flamengo footballers
Guarani FC players
Goiás Esporte Clube players
AS Saint-Étienne players
Paris Saint-Germain F.C. players
FC Rubin Kazan players
Club Athletico Paranaense players
São Paulo FC players
Al-Rayyan SC players
CR Vasco da Gama players
Ceará Sporting Club players
Brasiliense Futebol Clube players
Brusque Futebol Clube players
Clube de Regatas Brasil players
Associação Atlética Francana players
União Agrícola Barbarense Futebol Clube players
Grêmio de Esportes Maringá players
Esporte Clube Comercial (MS) players
Clube Desportivo Sete de Setembro players